Luis Eduardo Oyarbide Miranda (born September 1, 1986) is a Uruguayan footballer who plays as a midfielder for Iraklis Psachna in Greece.

Club career
Oyarbide started his career playing with the giant Club Nacional de Football in 2006. After his first season with the club, he was sent on a year-loan to Central Español in order to gain more continuity with the first team.

In January 2010, he moved to Montevideo Wanderers. He had a good season with the team playing 11 matches and scoring 3 goals.

In mid-2010, Oyarbide was transferred to El Tanque Sisley.

Democrata 
In early 2012, he moved to Brazilian side Democrata. His outstanding performances couldn't help the club escape from relegation to Modul II, after finishing 11th in the overall table.

Olympiakos Volou 
In summer 2012 he moved to Greek side Olympiakos Volou. On 21 October 2012, he scored his first goal against Panserraikos F.C. His second goal came on 11 November 2012 against Anagennisi Giannitsa F.C.

Iraklis Psachna 
In January 2013, he signed a new contract with Football League side Iraklis Psachna. He made his debut with the club on 27 January 2013 against Panetolikos F.C.

References

External links
 
 Profile at BDFA

1986 births
Living people
Uruguayan footballers
Uruguayan expatriate footballers
Club Nacional de Football players
Central Español players
Montevideo Wanderers F.C. players
El Tanque Sisley players
Olympiacos Volos F.C. players
Expatriate footballers in Brazil
Expatriate footballers in Greece
Association football midfielders